Herbert Halliwell Hobbes (16 November 187720 February 1962) was an English actor.

Early years
The future actor was the son of William Albert Hobbes (1841-1909), a Warwickshire solicitor, and his wife, Marion Hobbes, née Dennis, (1838-1925). His schooling came at Trinity College in Straford-on-Avon.

Career 
Hobbes's stage debut was as a member of Frank Benson's company, in the role of Tybalt in Romeo and Juliet in 1898, playing in Shakespearean rep alongside actors such as Ellen Terry and Mrs Patrick Campbell. His earliest American work was as an actor and director from 1906, before moving to Hollywood in early 1929 (aged 51) to play older men's roles such as clerics, butlers, doctors, lords and diplomats. He remained a British subject throughout his life.

Receiving fewer film roles during the 1940s (though he still managed to have been in over 100 films by 1949), he moved back to Broadway by the mid-1940s, appearing in Romeo and Juliet as Lord Capulet and continuing there until late 1955. By 1950 he had moved to American television in the diverse playhouse format.

A heart ailment caused Hobbes to retire in 1956.

Personal life 
In 1915, Hobbes married Nancie Brenda Marsland, an actress. They had one son. He increased the sunkenness of his cheeks by having his four 12-year-molars removed.

Death 
After Hobbes died from a heart attack on February 20, 1962, he was buried at the Chapel of the Pines Crematory in Los Angeles.

Filmography 

 Lucky in Love (1929) as Earl of Balkerry (film debut)
 Jealousy (1929) as Rigaud
 Grumpy (1930) as Ruddick
 Charley's Aunt (1930) as Stephen Spettigue
 The Bachelor Father (1931) as Larkin, the Butler
 The Right of Way (1931) as The Siegneur
 The Lady Refuses (1931) as Sir James - Lawyer (uncredited)
 Five and Ten (1931) as Hopkins (uncredited)
 The Woman Between (1931) as Barton - the Butler
 The Sin of Madelon Claudet (1931) as Roget
 Platinum Blonde (1931) as Butler
 Dr. Jekyll and Mr. Hyde (1931) as Brig. Gen. Danvers Carew
 Forbidden (1932) as Florist (uncredited)
 Lovers Courageous (1932) as Mr. Smith
 The Menace (1932) as Phillips
 Love Affair (1932) as Kibbee
 Devil's Lottery (1932) as Lord Litchfield
 Man About Town (1932) as Hilton
 Week Ends Only (1932) as Martin
 Six Hours to Live (1932) as Baron Emil von Sturm
 Payment Deferred (1932) as A Prospective Tenant
 Cynara (1932) as Coroner at Inquest
 Looking Forward (1933) as Mr. James Felton
 A Study in Scarlet (1933) as Dearing
 Midnight Mary (1933) as Churchill
 Captured! (1933) as British Major General
 The Masquerader (1933) as Brock
 Lady for a Day (1933) as Butler
 If I Were Free (1933) as Burford - Gordon's Butler (uncredited)
 Should Ladies Behave (1933) as Louis
 I Am Suzanne (1933) as Dr. Lorenzo
 Mandalay (1934) as Col. Dawson Ames
 Riptide (1934) as Bollard
 All Men Are Enemies (1934) as Clarendon
 Double Door (1934) as Mr. Chase
 The Key (1934) as General C.O. Furlong
 Madame Du Barry (1934) as English Ambassador
 Bulldog Drummond Strikes Back (1934) as First Bobby
 She Was a Lady (1934) as George Dane
 British Agent (1934) as Sir Walter Carrister
 We Live Again (1934) as Official (uncredited)
 Menace (1934) as Skinner
 Father Brown, Detective (1934) as Sir Leopold Fischer
 The Right to Live (1935) as Sir Stephen Barr
 Folies Bergère de Paris (1935) as Monsieur Paulet
 Vanessa: Her Love Story (1935) as Father of Little Girl (uncredited)
 Cardinal Richelieu (1935) as Father Joseph
 Jalna (1935) as Uncle Ernest Whiteoak
 Charlie Chan in Shanghai (1935) as Chief of Police
 Millions in the Air (1935) as Theodore
 Captain Blood (1935) as Lord Sunderland (uncredited)
 Rose Marie (1936) as Mr. Gordon (uncredited)
 Here Comes Trouble (1936) as Prof. Howard
 The Story of Louis Pasteur (1936) as Dr. Lister
 Dracula's Daughter (1936) as Hawkins
 Changing of the Guard (1936, Short) as Grandfather, the Colonel 
 Hearts Divided (1936) as Cambaceres
 The White Angel (1936) as Lord Raglan
 Spendthrift (1936) as Beuhl - the Butler
 Mary of Scotland (1936) as Minor Role (uncredited)
 Give Me Your Heart (1936) as Oliver
 Love Letters of a Star (1936) as Hotchkiss
 Maid of Salem (1937) as Jeremiah
 The Prince and the Pauper (1937) as Archbishop
 Parnell (1937) as W.H. Smith (uncredited)
 Fit for a King (1937) as Count Strunsky
 Varsity Show (1937) as Dean Meredith
 The Jury's Secret (1938) as John, The Butler
 Bulldog Drummond's Peril (1938) as Professor Bernard Goodman
 Kidnapped (1938) as Dominie Campbell
 You Can't Take It With You (1938) as DePinna
 Service de Luxe (1938) as Butler
 Storm Over Bengal (1938) as Sir John Galt
 A Christmas Carol (1938) as Clergyman Sliding on Sidewalk (uncredited)
 Pacific Liner (1939) as Captain Mathews
 The Hardys Ride High (1939) as Dobbs, the Butler
 Tell No Tales (1939) as Dr. Lovelake
 Naughty but Nice (1939) as Dean Burton, Winfield College
 Nurse Edith Cavell (1939) as English Chaplain
 Remember? (1939) as Butler Williams
 The Light That Failed (1939) as Doctor
 The Earl of Chicago (1940) as Lord Chancellor
 Waterloo Bridge (1940) as Vicar at St. Matthews (uncredited)
 The Sea Hawk (1940) as Astronomer
 Third Finger, Left Hand (1940) as Burton
 Lady with Red Hair (1940) as Divorce Judge (uncredited)
 That Hamilton Woman (1941) as Rev. Nelson
 Sunny (1941) as Johnson (uncredited)
 Here Comes Mr. Jordan (1941) as Sisk
 Dr. Kildare's Wedding Day (1941) as Minister (uncredited)
 Son of Fury: The Story of Benjamin Blake (1942) as Purdy
 To Be or Not to Be (1942) as General Armstrong
 The War Against Mrs. Hadley (1942) as Bennett
 The Undying Monster (1942) as Walton, the Butler
 Journey for Margaret (1942) as Mr. Barrie
 Forever and a Day (1943) as Doctor
 Sherlock Holmes Faces Death (1943) as Brunton
 Mr. Muggs Steps Out (1943) as Charney, the Butler
 His Butler's Sister (1943) as Willebrandt (uncredited)
 Gaslight (1944) as Mr. Muffin
 Mr. Skeffington (1944) as Soames (uncredited)
 The Invisible Man's Revenge (1944) as Cleghorn
 Casanova Brown (1944) as Charles
 Information Please (1944, Short) as Leutnant Eberhard (uncredited) 
 Canyon Passage (1946) as Clenchfield
 If Winter Comes (1947) as The Coroner
 The Black Arrow (1948) as Bishop of Tisbury
 You Gotta Stay Happy (1948) as Martin
 That Forsyte Woman (1949) as Nicholas Forsyte
 Miracle in the Rain (1956) as Ely B. 'Windy' Windgate (final film)

Partial Broadway credits
 And Then There Were None (1943)
 Murder on the Nile/Hidden Horizon (1944–45)

References

External links

1877 births
1962 deaths
English male film actors
People from Stratford-upon-Avon
20th-century English male actors
Burials at Chapel of the Pines Crematory
English male stage actors
British emigrants to the United States